Weald Clay or the Weald Clay Formation is a Lower Cretaceous sedimentary rock unit underlying areas of South East England, between the North and South Downs, in an area called the Weald Basin.  It is the uppermost unit of the Wealden Group of rocks within the Weald Basin, and the upper portion of the unit is equivalent in age to the exposed portion of the Wessex Formation on the Isle of Wight. It predominantly consists of thinly bedded mudstone. The un-weathered form is blue/grey, and the yellow/orange is the weathered form, it is used in brickmaking.

The formation was deposited in lagoonal, lacustrine and alluvial conditions that varied from freshwater to brackish. The clay alternates with other subordinate lithologies, notably hard red-weathering beds of ironstone, limestone (Sussex Marble) and sandstones, notably including the calcareous sandstone unit referred to as the Horsham Stone. It has a gradual, conformable contact with the underlying Tunbridge Wells Sand Formation,  and has a sharp, unconformable contact with the overlying Atherfield Clay Formation, a shallow marine unit deposited after marine transgression during the Aptian.

Physical properties 

The weathered and unweathered forms of the Weald Clay have different physical properties. Blue looks superficially like a soft slate, is quite dry and hard and will support the weight of buildings quite easily. Because it is quite impermeable, and so dry, it does not get broken by tree roots. It is typically found at 750mm down below a layer of yellow clay. Yellow, found on the surface, absorbs water quite readily so becomes very soft in the winter. The two different types make quite different bricks.

Paleofauna

Vertebrates

Invertebrates 
Numerous insect species are known from several localities in the Weald Clay, including Rudgwick Brickworks, Auclaye Brickworks, Smokejacks and Clockhouse Brickworks

See also

 Wealden District
 London Clay
 Oxford Clay
 List of dinosaur-bearing rock formations

Footnotes

References
 Weishampel, David B.; Dodson, Peter; and Osmólska, Halszka (eds.): The Dinosauria, 2nd, Berkeley: University of California Press. 861 pp. .

Geology of England
Geologic formations of the United Kingdom
Claystone
Lower Cretaceous Series of Europe
Hauterivian Stage
Barremian Stage